Moroşanu is a Romanian surname. Notable people with the surname include:

Angela Moroşanu (born 1986), Romanian sprinter
Cătălin Moroșanu (born 1984), Romanian kickboxer
Gheorghe Moroșanu (born 1950), Romanian mathematician

Romanian-language surnames